Osteometric points (bone measuring points) are an agreed upon set of locations on the skeleton, or more commonly the skull, that aid in the study of osteology. These points were developed to help researchers make comparative measurements between specimens, and report finding in a unified and unambiguous manner.

These points are often placed at key landmarks or bone sutures (e.g. Bregma- where the coronal and sagittal sutures intersect) to simplify the process of properly identifying them.

Common Cranial Osteometric points
 Incision- the point on the occlusal where the upper central incisors meet. 
 Nasion- the midpoint where the two nasal bones and the frontal bone intersect. 
 Glabella- The forward most mid-line point on the frontal bone.
 Bregma- Mid line point where the coronal and sagittal sutures intersect.
 Gnathion- The most inferior mid-line point on the mandible.
 Porion- The highest point the external auditory meatus.
 Orbitale- The lowest point on the orbital.

References: 

Skeletal system
Medical terminology